Lewen Sharp (sometimes Lewin) was a British architect.

In 1901, Sharp designed the Apollo Theatre, on London's Shaftesbury Avenue for Henry Lowenfeld.

In 1908, Sharp made major alterations to the Camberwell Palace.

References

Architects from London
Year of birth missing
Year of death missing
20th-century English architects